The Battle of Farmington is a name given to two different battles during the American Civil War:
 Battle of Farmington, Tennessee
 Battle of Farmington, Mississippi, part of the Siege of Corinth

See also 
 Farmington (disambiguation)